Ralph McKenzie Riach (26 January 1936 – 20 March 2022) was a Scottish actor from Elgin, Moray.

Early years
Riach was born on 26 January 1937 in Elgin, Scotland. He was educated at the Royal Conservatoire of Scotland in Glasgow, and he worked in Perth on a variety of jobs before he began his acting career.

Career
Riach portrayed John McIver (better known as "TV John") in BBC One Scotland's comedy/drama Hamish Macbeth. His career began at the age of 50, when he appeared in Lost Empires (1986). He appeared in television shows including Chancer, Mosley, Taggart, Monarch of the Glen, Peak Practice, Doctor Finlay, and Tutti Frutti.

Film appearances included The House of Mirth (2000), The Messenger: The Story of Joan of Arc (1999), Braveheart (1995), Copying Beethoven (2006) and Cloud Atlas (2012). He also portrayed John Laurie in We're Doomed! The Dad's Army Story (2015). In 2014, he played a scene in Scottish feature film Time Teens: The Beginning directed by Ryan Alexander Dewar. He appeared in the short film Darkness in The Afternoon in 1999.

Filmography

Film

Television

References

External links
 
 

1936 births
2022 deaths
People from Elgin, Moray
Scottish male film actors
Scottish male radio actors
Scottish male television actors